Gregory Pateryn (born June 20, 1990) is an American former professional ice hockey defenseman who played in the National Hockey League (NHL). He was selected by the Toronto Maple Leafs in the fifth round, 128th overall, at the 2008 NHL Entry Draft.

Playing career

Amateur
As a youth, Pateryn played in the 2003 Quebec International Pee-Wee Hockey Tournament with the Detroit Little Caesars minor ice hockey team. Pateryn then attended Birmingham Brother Rice High School from 2004 to 2007, where he captained the hockey team. For the 2007–08 season, Pateryn played with the Ohio Junior Blue Jackets in the United States Hockey League. He was later drafted by the Toronto Maple Leafs in the 2008 NHL Entry Draft after accumulating 27 points in 60 games.

Pateryn then attended the University of Michigan, where he played four seasons of NCAA Division I college hockey with the Wolverines ice hockey team in the Central Collegiate Hockey Association (CCHA).

Professional
Pateryn's tenure as a prospect within the Maple Leafs was short lived, as on July 2, 2008, he was included in a trade by Toronto along with a second-round selection in the 2010 entry draft to the Montreal Canadiens in exchange for forward Mikhail Grabovski.

On March 28, 2012, the Canadiens signed Pateryn to a two-year, entry-level contract. He made his debut with the Canadiens in the second half of the 2012–13 season, going scoreless in three games.

On May 8, 2014, the Canadiens re-signed Pateryn to a two-year contract extension. This was followed by an additional two-year extension on July 1, 2015.

In the 2016–17 season, Pateryn made the opening night roster, solidifying his role as a depth defender among the Canadiens blueline. Having appeared in 24 games and approaching the NHL trade deadline, Pateryn was dealt by the Canadiens to the Dallas Stars along with a 4th round draft pick in the 2017 NHL Entry Draft for defenseman Jordie Benn on February 27, 2017.

Pateryn as a free agent in the off-season, left the Stars and signed a three-year, $6.75 million contract with the Minnesota Wild on July 1, 2018.

Entering his final year under contract with the Wild in the pandemic delayed 2020–21 season, Pateryn registered 2 assists through the opening 3 games before he was traded by Minnesota to divisional rival, the Colorado Avalanche, in exchange for Ian Cole on January 19, 2021. He made his Avalanche debut, playing in a third-pairing role in a 4–2 defeat to the Los Angeles Kings on January 21, 2021. Following his third game with Colorado and with the blueline returning to health Pateryn was placed on waivers by the Avalanche on January 25, 2021. Placed on the club's taxi squad, Pateryn was later reassigned to AHL affiliate, the Colorado Eagles, on February 11, 2021. Selected as interim captain, Pateryn scored the season opening goal in his debut with the Eagles in a 3–2 defeat to the San Diego Gulls on February 13, 2021.

Approaching the trade deadline, having played sparingly between the Avalanche and the Eagles, Pateryn was traded for the second time within the season to the San Jose Sharks along with a 2021 fifth-round selection, in exchange for Devan Dubnyk on April 10, 2021. He was immediately re-assigned to join AHL affiliate, the San Jose Barracuda.

With his contract concluded with the Shark in the following off-season, Pateryn as a free agent was signed to add depth to the Anaheim Ducks on a one-year, two-way contract on July 29, 2021. In the  season, Pateryn remained on the Ducks roster and made 10 appearances before he was re-assigned to captain AHL affiliate, the San Diego Gulls for the remainder of his contract.

As a free agent in the off-season, Pateryn effectively announced his retirement from professional hockey after 10 seasons in accepting a professional scouting role within the Pittsburgh Penguins organization on August 8, 2022.

Personal life
Pateryn is of Ukrainian descent and is fluent in the language.

Career statistics

References

External links

1990 births
Living people
American men's ice hockey defensemen
American people of Ukrainian descent
Anaheim Ducks players
Colorado Avalanche players
Colorado Eagles players
Dallas Stars players
Hamilton Bulldogs (AHL) players
Ice hockey players from Michigan
Iowa Wild players
Michigan Wolverines men's ice hockey players
Minnesota Wild players
Montreal Canadiens players
Ohio Junior Blue Jackets players
St. John's IceCaps players
San Diego Gulls (AHL) players
San Jose Barracuda players
San Jose Sharks players
Sportspeople from Sterling Heights, Michigan
Toronto Maple Leafs draft picks